West Virginia Route 59 was a state highway in the U.S. state of West Virginia. It ran from West Virginia Route 259 at Lost City east to the Virginia state line, where it became secondary State Route 691. About one-third of the route is unpaved.

While officially designated and shown on West Virginia Division of Highways maps as a state route, the road was signed in the field as a county route since at least the 1990s. The route was formally decommissioned on March 16, 2018, when a Highways Commissioner's Order was signed redesignating the road as Hardy County Route 59.

Major intersections

References

059
Transportation in Hardy County, West Virginia